Adam Bousdoukos (born 25 January 1974) is a German actor of Greek origin. He has appeared in more than 50 films since 1995.

Life 
Growing up as the son of Greek parents in the Hamburg district of Altona, Bousdoukos played smaller roles in commercials as a teenager and later took classes at the Stage School Hamburg.

In 1998, Bousdoukos had a role in Fatih Akin's Short Sharp Shock and, together with the other two leading actors Mehmet Kurtuluş and Aleksandar Jovanovic, received the Leopard award at the Locarno Festival in 1998 and the Grimme-Preis in 2001.  With the exception of Getürkt, Bousdoukos can be seen in every film by his friend Akın, including Soul Kitchen (2009), where he had the leading role and wrote the script. The cinematic collaboration with Akin began in 1995 with the short film Sensin – Du bist es!.

In addition, Bousdoukos appeared in a number of other movie and TV roles. He also ran the "Sotiris" restaurant in the Ottensen district of Hamburg for almost ten years.

Charity work 
Adam Bousdoukos with friends has been supporting the Soul Kids association since 2009. The organization raises funds through various events and activities, which are donated to selected non-profit associations, institutions and projects.

Selected filmography

 1995: Sensin – Du bist es! (short)
 1998: Short Sharp Shock
 2000: In July
 2000:  Die Pfefferkörner
 2002: Solino
 2003: Adelheid und ihre Mörder (Episode: Millionenpuzzle)
 2004: Kebab Connection
 2004: Head-On
 2009: Soul Kitchen
 2011: Chalet Girl 
 2011–2019: Großstadtrevier (TV series, 2 episodes)
 2012: Life Is Not for Cowards
 2012: Leipzig Homicide (TV series, 1 episode)
 2013: Stuttgart Homicide (TV series, 1 episode)
 2014: Der letzte Bulle (TV series, 7 episodes)
 2014: The Cut
 2014–2015: Lindenstraße (TV series, 11 episodes)
 2015: Tetarti 04:45
 2015: 
 2019: The Golden Glove
 2019: SOKO Hamburg (TV series, episode Der Lottokönig)

References

External links 

1974 births
Living people
German male film actors
German people of Greek descent
Male actors from Hamburg